|}

The Prix Minerve is a Group 3 flat horse race in France open to three-year-old thoroughbred fillies. It is run at Deauville over a distance of 2,500 metres (about 1 mile and 4½ furlongs), and it is scheduled to take place each year in August.

History
The event is named after Minerva, the Roman goddess of crafts and wisdom. It was established in 1925, and it was originally called the Prix de Minerve. It was initially staged at Le Tremblay with a distance of 2,000 metres.

The race was abandoned in 1940, and for a period thereafter it was contested over 2,100 metres at Maisons-Laffitte (1941–43) and Auteuil (1944). It returned to Le Tremblay in 1945, and its former distance was restored in 1946. It was held at Longchamp from 1948 to 1950, and on the last two occasions it was run over 2,100 metres.

Le Tremblay closed in 1967, and the Prix de Minerve began a five-year spell at Chantilly the following year. It was transferred to Évry in 1973, and extended to 2,400 metres in 1976. The present version of its title, without the "de", was introduced in 1987.

The Prix Minerve took place at Saint-Cloud in 1993, and for the next three years it continued at Évry. It moved to Deauville in 1997, and at this point it was increased to 2,500 metres. The race was sponsored by Shadwell from 2005 to 2010.

Records
Leading jockey (7 wins):
 Yves Saint-Martin – Red Flame (1963), Flaming Heart (1966), Paulista (1974), Acoma (1976), Rajpoura (1983), Sharaniya (1986), Daralinsha (1987)

Leading trainer (10 wins):
 André Fabre – Colorado Dancer (1989), Wajd (1990), Bright Moon (1993), Isle de France (1998), Prairie Runner (1999), Oiseau Rare (2005), Synopsis (2007), Kalla (2009), Announce (2010), Tamniah (2019)

Leading owner (11 wins):
 HH Aga Khan IV – Flaming Heart (1966), Rajpoura (1983), Sharaniya (1986), Daralinsha (1987), Linnga (1992), Sharamana (1994), Kassana (1997), Oiseau Rare (2005), Shareta (2011), Zarshana (2014), Candarliya (2015)

Winners since 1979

Earlier winners

 1925: Lucide
 1926: Carissima / Miss McKinley *
 1927: Bellecour
 1928: Tanais
 1929: Kantara
 1930: La Savoyarde
 1931: Pearl Cap
 1932: Broadway Melody / Kiddie *
 1933: La Souriciere
 1934: Anatolie
 1935: Blue Bell
 1936: Capella
 1937: Sylvanire
 1938: Argolide
 1939: Kaligoussa
 1940: no race
 1941: La Barka
 1942: Gold and Blue
 1943: Calonice
 1944: La Belle du Canet
 1945: Red Sky
 1946: Pastourelle
 1947: Love
 1948: Reine des Etoiles
 1949: Musette
 1950: Nuit de Folies
 1951: Maitrise
 1952: Abeille
 1953: Avenida
 1954: Yvrande
 1955: Cassilda
 1956: Sees
 1957: Great Success
 1958: Lady Djebel
 1959: Mandolina
 1960: Valrose
 1961: Parbel
 1962: Peisqueira
 1963: Red Flame
 1964: Astaria
 1965: Irish Lass
 1966: Flaming Heart
 1967: Armoricana
 1968: Valya
 1969: Insulaire
 1970: Gleam
 1971: Cambrizzia
 1972: Paysanne
 1973: El Mina
 1974: Paulista
 1975: Raise a Baby
 1976: Acoma
 1977: Trillion
 1978: I Will Follow

* The 1926 and 1932 races were dead-heats and have joint winners.

See also
 List of French flat horse races

References

 France Galop / Racing Post:

 france-galop.com – A Brief History: Prix Minerve.
 galop.courses-france.com – Prix Minerve – Palmarès depuis 1983.
 galopp-sieger.de – Prix Minerve.
 horseracingintfed.com – International Federation of Horseracing Authorities – Prix Minerve (2017).
 pedigreequery.com – Prix Minerve – Deauville.

Flat horse races for three-year-old fillies
Deauville-La Touques Racecourse
Horse races in France
Recurring sporting events established in 1925
1925 establishments in France